Chryseobacterium taiwanense is a bacterium. It is Gram-negative, rod-shaped, non-spore-forming, yellow-pigmented and its type strain is strain Soil-3-27(T) (=BCRC 17412(T)=IAM 15317(T)=LMG 23355(T)).

References

Further reading

Whitman, William B., et al., eds. Bergey's manual® of systematic bacteriology. Vol. 5. Springer, 2012.
Van Wyk, Esias Renier. Virulence Factors and Other Clinically Relevant Characteristics of Chryseobacterium Species. Diss. University of the Freee State, 2008.

External links 
LPSN

Type strain of Chryseobacterium taiwanense at BacDive -  the Bacterial Diversity Metadatabase

taiwanense
Bacteria described in 2006